Francis Terry may refer to:

Francis Terry (architect) (born 1969), British architect
Francis Terry (cricketer) (1860–1936), English cricketer